ZBL may refer to:

 Biloela Airport (IATA code ZBL), an airport in Biloela, Queensland, Australia
 Blissymbol (ISO 639-3 code zbl), a constructed language